The Tullock Formation is a geologic formation in Montana. It preserves fossils dating back to the Paleogene period.

See also

 List of fossiliferous stratigraphic units in Montana
 Paleontology in Montana

References
 

Geologic formations of the United States
Paleogene Montana
Puercan